Charan Moore is a South African motorcycle racer. He won the Original by Motul class in the 2023 Dakar Rally for bike competitors competing without any kind of assistance.

Career
Moore made his Dakar Rally debut in 2022, finishing in 34th place in the motorcycle class and 4th in the Original by Motul category. He returned in 2023, this time winning in the ObM category while finishing 28th overall.

Career results

Dakar Rally results

References

Date of birth missing (living people)
Living people
South African motorcycle racers
Dakar Rally motorcyclists
Off-road motorcycle racers
Year of birth missing (living people)